Dastur Khan's Mosque, also known as Paththarwali Masjid, is a medieval mosque in Ahmedabad, India.

The mosque is located south of Jama Masjid near the Astodiya Gate. The mosque was built in 1486 or 1463 during the reign of Mahmud Begada in the city by Dastur Khan, also known as Malik Khasazada, one of his ministers.

The tomb of Dastur Khan is located near the south doorway in an open courtyard within the complex of the mosque. The courtyard walls are decorated with perforated stone windows.

Gallery

References 

Mosques in Ahmedabad
Monuments of National Importance in Gujarat